The Pietzschebach  is a river of Saxony, Germany. It rises in Haselbrunn, Plauen and runs into the river White Elster.

See also
List of rivers of Saxony

Rivers of Saxony
Rivers of Germany